Alternative Records was an independent record label based in Eugene, Oregon. The label started in 1989 and has not released an album since 1998.

Formed from its previous incarnation as a mail order record company starting in 1979, Randy Layton started the label as an outlet for former Exit Records artists Steve Scott and The 77s to release back catalogue and unreleased works. The label took on other artists over time, and after distribution deals with BMG and Word Canada ended, the company shut down except for occasional fan club releases.

The company was known for its many collector's versions of its albums. More Miserable Than You'll Ever Be by The 77s was  issued as a box set with a 7" single, a 3-track CD single, and a 4-track cassette as a numbered, signed edition of 1,000 before being reconfigured for CD with a different track listing.

Artists 
7&7iS (Inactive; side-project for members of The 77s)
The 77s (Active, with Fools of the World/Lo-Fidelity Records)
Daniel Amos (Active, with Arena Rock Recording Co.)
Eagle Park Slim (Active, with Appleseed Recordings
Gloryhouse (Status unknown)
John Nau (Active as a session musician)
Steve Scott (Inactive)
The Scratch Band (Changed name to The 77s)
Silver Express (Status unknown)
Skeleton Closet (Status unknown)
Two Pound Planet (Active, currently unsigned)
Robert Vaughn (Inactive)

Discography
Steve Scott - Lost Horizon (ES 4001) (1989)
7&7iS; The 77s - More Miserable Than You'll Ever Be (ES 4002) (1989 box set, 1990, 1992 reissues)
Various Artists - The Summer Sampler (ES PR-4006) (1990) 
Steve Scott - Magnificent Obsession (ES 4007) (1991)
Robert Vaughn & The Shadows - Songs From The Riverhouse (ES 4009) (1991)
Two Pound Planet - Songs From The Hydrogen Jukebox (ES 4010) (1992)
White Trash Supper Club (ES 4011) (1992)
Various Artists - No Sense of History/Shirley, Goodness, & Misery (ES 4013 A/B) (1992, released with Stunt Records)
Various Artists - Bootlevel (ES 4014) (LP version, 1992)
Two Pound Planet - Whispering Delicious (ES 4015) (1993)
Various Artists - Bootlevel (ES 4017) (1994, cd version; aka "Bootlevel 2")
Robert Vaughn - Decayed (ES 4018) (1994)
Skeleton Closet - Skeleton Closet (ES 4019;SW 9501) (1996)
Lightweight - Lightweight (ES 4020) (1996)
Eagle Park Slim - Northwest Blues (1998)

References

External links
 Alternative Records: remnants of official home page
 Manta (Dun & Bradstreet): Alternative Records

See also
 List of record labels

Record labels established in 1989
Record labels disestablished in 1998
American independent record labels
Christian record labels
Rock record labels
Companies based in Eugene, Oregon
Oregon record labels
Defunct companies based in Oregon
1989 establishments in Oregon